Jade Topia (born 26 December 1986) is a former New Zealand netball player. Topia played in the National Bank Cup for the Southern Sting (2005) and Canterbury Flames (2006–07). With the start of the ANZ Championship in 2008, Topia signed with the Auckland-based Northern Mystics. After the 2009 season, she transferred to the Southern Steel. Topia was also a member of Silver Ferns' extended squad.

References
2009 Northern Mystics profile. Retrieved on 2008-05-10.

1986 births
Living people
New Zealand netball players
Northern Mystics players
Southern Steel players
ANZ Championship players
Southern Sting players
Canterbury Flames players